Julien Hébert (August 19, 1917 – May 24, 1994) was a Québécois industrial designer, perhaps most famous for creating the logo of the Montreal World Exposition, Expo 67.

Formerly a student of philosophy, Hébert began his design education as a student of sculpture at the École des Beaux-Arts de Montréal, continuing in 1947 in Paris under Ossip Zadkine. Hébert later became a teacher himself, teaching art history and sculpture at his alma mater, the École des beaux-arts, and instructing in planning and design at the École du meuble. He went on to assist in the establishment of the École du design industriel at the University of Montreal. . Earlier in his career he was also active as a comics artist. His best known series was Mouchette.

In 1979, Hébert was awarded the Prix Paul-Émile-Borduas by the Québécois Government.

Sources

External links
 Expo 67
 "Julien Hébert and the Emergence of Industrial Design in Canada" by M Racine, A Findeli - Design Issues, 2003 - MIT Press

1917 births
1994 deaths
People from Montérégie
Canadian industrial designers
Canadian comics artists
Expo 67
Montreal Metro artists
Artists from Quebec
Academic staff of the Université de Montréal
École des Beaux-Arts alumni
20th-century Canadian architects
École des beaux-arts de Montréal alumni
Academic staff of the École des beaux-arts de Montréal